Yevhen Hryhorovych Korol (born 21 May 1947 in Stalino) is a retired Soviet football player and currently a manager.

He is a father of Ukrainian player and coach Ihor Korol from Donetsk.

References

External links
 

1947 births
Living people
Sportspeople from Donetsk
Soviet footballers
Soviet Top League players
FC Lokomotyv Donetsk players
FC Shakhtar Donetsk players
FC Mariupol players
SKA Kiev players
SC Tavriya Simferopol players
Ukrainian football managers
FC Shakhtar-2 Donetsk managers
FC Shakhtar Shakhtarsk managers
FC Metalurh Donetsk managers
FC Tytan Donetsk managers
Association football midfielders